Palace Entertainment is a subsidiary of Madrid, Spain based Parques Reunidos which operates various attractions including  amusement parks, zoos, and water parks around the world. Palace Entertainment is based in Pittsburgh, Pennsylvania and is primarily involved in the operation of attractions in the United States.

History
Palace Entertainment was established in 1998, after the acquisition of four independently owned family entertainment companies. These four companies consisted of five brands: Camelot Parks, Palace Park, Boomers!, Grand Prix Race-O-Rama and Family Fun Center. In the early 2000s the company purchased various Water Parks and Family Entertainment Centers. 

On February 27, 2006, it was announced that MidOcean Partners was to acquire Palace Entertainment. This transaction occurred in the second quarter 2006.

On August 24, 2007, MidOcean Partners sold Palace Entertainment to Parques Reunidos for $330 Million. This transaction took place in the third quarter of 2007.

Fernando Eiroa joined Palace Entertainment in 2007, serving as president and Chief Executive Officer.

On December 11, 2007 Kennywood Entertainment Company entered an agreement to sell their Five Properties (Kennywood, Idlewild and Soak Zone, Sandcastle Waterpark, Lake Compounce and Story Land) to Palace Entertainment's parent company Parques Reunidos. By 2009 Palace had taken over operations of all five parks.

On November 12, 2010, Palace Entertainment announced the acquisition of Dutch Wonderland Family Amusement Park in historic Lancaster County, Pennsylvania, from Hershey Entertainment and Resorts Company.

On March 2, 2012, Palace Entertainment announced the acquisition of Noah's Ark Water Park in Wisconsin Dells, Wisconsin.

In 2014 Palace Entertainment acquired Miami Seaquarium in Key Biscayne, Florida.

Later that year Palace Entertainment sold 15 properties to the newly formed Apex Parks Group Including Big Kahuna's, 10 Boomers locations as well as an additional Family 4 Entertainment Centers. This was in an effort to move away from Family Entertainment Center operations for Palace Entertainment.

In March 2020 it was announced that Palace Entertainment would open a new corporate facility near the Kennywood property. This new facility will house 25 executives as well as their East Coast team.

In December of 2021 Palace Entertainment would acquire Adventureland in Altoona, Iowa.

Amusement parks

Water parks

Marine animal parks

Family entertainment centers

Hotels and campgrounds

Former properties

References

External links 

MidOcean Partners website
 Parques Reunidos Group website—

 
Amusement park companies
Entertainment companies based in California
Companies based in Newport Beach, California
Entertainment companies established in 1998
1998 establishments in California
Parques Reunidos